The Surveillance Devices Act 2004 is an act of law in the Commonwealth of Australia.

Annual reports
Annual reports are issued on the use of the act by the Australian Government Attorney General's Department.

See also
 Australian law
 Telecommunications (Interception and Access) Act 1979
 Telecommunications Act 1997
 Privacy Act 1988
 Mass surveillance in Australia

References

External links
Surveillance Devices Act 2004, at ComLaw
Surveillance Devices Act 2004, at the Australasian Legal Information Institute
Telecommunications Interception & Access Laws, Electronic Frontiers Australia

2004 in Australian law
Acts of the Parliament of Australia